Voting behavior is a form of electoral behavior. Understanding voters' behavior can explain how and why decisions were made either by public decision-makers, which has been a central concern for political scientists, or by the electorate. To interpret voting behavior both political science and psychology expertise were necessary and therefore the field of political psychology emerged including electoral psychology. Political psychology researchers study ways in which affective influence may help voters make more informed voting choices, with some proposing that affect may explain how the electorate makes informed political choices in spite of low overall levels of political attentiveness and sophistication. Conversely, Bruter and Harrison suggest that electoral psychology encompasses the ways in which personality, memory, emotions, and other psychological factors affect citizens' electoral experience and behavior.

To make inferences and predictions about behavior concerning a voting decision, certain factors such as gender, race, culture or religion must be considered. Furthermore, a more theoretical approach can be taken when viewing electoral behaviour; such as viewing wealth and region in which a voter lives which will impact upon their electoral choices. Moreover, key public influences include the role of emotions, political socialization, tolerance of diversity of political views and the media. The effect of these influences on voting behavior is best understood through theories on the formation of attitudes, beliefs, schema, knowledge structures and the practice of information processing. For example, surveys from different countries indicate that people are generally happier in individualistic cultures where they have rights such as the right to vote. Additionally, social influence and peer effects, as originating from family and friends, also play an important role in elections and voting behavior. The degree to which voting decision is affected by internal processes and external influences alters the quality of making truly democratic decisions. Bruter and Harrison also suggest that the decision is not a mere expression of a preference as they say that voters embrace a role in elections and differentiate between 'referees' and 'supporters'.

Voting behavior types 
Voter behavior is often influenced by voter loyalty. There is a mix of satisfaction and how issues are dealt with by the party. There is a correlation between how the voter finds the satisfaction of what the party has achieved and dealt with a situation, and then the intention of voting for the same party again. Something the author calls satisfaction and intention to purchase. Information is important to discuss when talking about voting in general. The information provided to the voter, not only influences who to vote for, but if they are intending to vote or not. Palfrey and Poole discuss this in their paper on information and voting behaviour. These elements have a direct effect on where one's party identification lies. This is largely due to the ability to have the party agendas available and increase the understanding and recognition of the topics which are being dealt with. This in combination with Schofield and Reeves means that the progression of the identification comes from recognition and the loyalty is followed if they find satisfaction in how the party performed, then the likelihood of a re-occurring vote in the next election is high.

When speaking of voting behavior in relation to cleavages, there are some which are interesting factors to look into. The three cleavage-based voting factors focused on in research are class, gender and religion. Firstly, religion is often a factor which influences one's party choice. In recent years this voting cleavage has moved away from concerns of Protestant vs Catholic to having a larger focus on religious vs non-religious leanings. A second influential factor is class. Traditional conceptions of class voting dictate a working-class preference towards parties on the left and middle-class preference for parties on the right. The influences of class voting however are greatly reliant upon the political environment they are convinced, many nations observe the opposite preferences. Lastly, it is the influence of gender. Women are more likely to support left-leaning parties. One explanation for this is employment, as women are more likely to work in the public sector. Parties on the left tend to support a more involved welfare state and more funding for public sector jobs, and people dependent on a job within government-driven sectors would benefit from a leftist party political agenda. 
Many cleavage-based voting behaviors are interconnected and frequently build on each other. These factors also tend to hold different levels of weight depending on the country in question. There is no universal explanation for a voting cleavage, and there is no general answer which explains a cleavage of all democratic countries. Each factor will have a different level of importance and influence on one's vote dependent on the country one is voting in.

Individuals use different criteria when we vote, based on the type of election it is. Therefore, voting behavior is also conditional to the election which is held. Different factors are in play in a national election vs. a regional election based on the voter's preferred outcome. For each individual, the order of importance of factors like loyalty, satisfaction, employment, gender, religion and class may look very different in a national or regional elections, even when the elections occur with relatively similar candidates, issues and time frames. For example, religion may play a larger role in a national election than in regional one, or vice versa. The importance of the location in which these types of elections occur in an urban or rural environment is an additional factor to voter mindset.

The existing literature does not provide an explicit classification of voting behavior types. However, research following the Cypriot referendum of 2004 identified four distinct voting behaviors depending on the election type. Citizens use different decision criteria if they are called to exercise their right to vote in presidential, legislative, local elections or in a referendum. In national elections it is usually the norm for people to vote based on their political beliefs. In local and regional elections, people tend to elect those who seem more capable to contribute to their area. A referendum follows another logic as people are specifically asked to vote for or against a clearly defined policy.

Partisan (politics) voting is also an important motive behind an individual's vote and can influence voting behavior to some extent. In 2000, a research study on partisanship voting in the US found evidence that partisan voting has a large effect. However, partisan voting has a larger effect on national elections, such as a presidential election, than it does on congressional elections. Furthermore, there is also a distinction of partisan voting behavior relative to a voter's age and education. Those over 50 years old and those without a high school diploma are more likely to vote based on partisan loyalty. This research is based on the US  and has not been confirmed to accurately predict voting patterns in other democracies.

A 1960 study of postwar Japan found that urban citizens were more likely to be supportive of socialist or progressive parties, while rural citizens were favorable of conservative parties. Regardless of the political preference, this is an interesting differentiation that can be attributed to effective influence.

Voters have also been seen to be affected by coalition and alliance politics, whether such coalitions form before or after the election. In these cases, voters can be swayed by feelings on coalition partners when considering their feelings toward their preferred party.

The concept of electoral ergonomics was created by Michael Brute and Sarah Harrison, who defined it as the interface between electoral arrangements and organization and the psychology of voters. In other words, it examines how the structure of an election or voting process influences the psychology of voters in a given election.

It is important to consider how electoral arrangements affect the emotions of the voter and therefore their electoral behavior. In the week running up to elections, 20 to 30% of voters either decide who they will vote for or change their initial decisions, with around half of them on election day. One study has found that people are more likely to vote for conservative candidates if polling stations are located in a church, and another study finds voters aged 18–24 are nearly twice as likely to vote for parties on the extreme right if voting is done through the post.

Affective influence 
A growing body of literature on the significance of affect in politics finds that affective states play a role in public voting behavior that can be both beneficial and biasing. Affect here refers to the experience of emotion or feeling, which is often described in contrast to cognition. This work largely follows from findings in psychology regarding the ways in which affective states are involved in human judgment and decision-making.

Research in political science has traditionally ignored non-rational considerations in its theories of mass political behavior, but the incorporation of social psychology has become increasingly common. In exploring the benefits of affect on voting, researchers have argued that affective states such as anxiety and enthusiasm encourage the evaluation of new political information and thus benefit political behavior by leading to more considered choices. Others, however, have discovered ways in which affect such as emotion and mood can significantly bias the voting choices of the electorate. For example, evidence has shown that a variety of events that are irrelevant to the evaluation of candidates but can stir emotions, such as the outcome of football matches and weather, can significantly affect voting decisions.

Several variables have been proposed that may moderate the relationship between emotion and voting. Researchers have shown that one such variable may be political sophistication, with higher sophistication voters more likely to experience emotions in response to political stimuli and thus more prone to emotional biases in voting choice. Affective intensity has also been shown to moderate the relationship between affect and voting, with one study finding a doubling of estimated effect for higher-intensity affective shocks.

Another variable which has been shown to influence voting behaviour is the weather. Hot temperatures can have divergent effects on human behaviour, due to the fact that it can lead to heightened arousal. As such, increases in arousal due to increases in temperature might impact the result of an election, because of its proposed impact on collective behaviours such as voter turnout. Previous studies have found that hot temperatures increase anger, which, in turn, motivates people to vote.

Mechanisms of affective influence on voting 

The differential effect of several specific emotions have been studied on voting behavior:
 
Surprise – Recent research suggests that the emotion of surprise may magnify the effect of emotions on voting. In assessing the effect of home-team sports victories on voting, Healy et al. showed that surprising victories provided close to twice the benefit to the incumbent party compared to victories overall.

Anger – Affective theory would predict that anger increases the use of generalized knowledge and reliance upon stereotypes and other heuristics. An experiment on students at the University of Massachusetts Amherst showed that people who had been primed with an anger condition relied less upon issue-concordance when choosing between candidates than those who had been primed with fear. In a separate laboratory study, subjects primed with the anger emotion were significantly less likely to seek information about a candidate and spent less time reviewing a candidate's policy positions on the web.

Anxiety – Affective intelligence theory identifies anxiety as an emotion that increases political attentiveness while decreasing reliance on party identification when deciding between candidates, thus improving decision-making capabilities. Voters who report anxiety regarding an election are more likely to vote for candidates whose policies they prefer, and party members who report feeling anxious regarding a candidate are twice as likely to defect and vote for the opposition candidate. Others have denied that anxiety's indirect influence on voting behavior has been proven to the exclusion of alternative explanations, such as the possibility that less preferred candidates produce feelings of anxiety, as opposed to the reverse.

Fear – Studies in psychology has shown that people experiencing fear rely on more detailed processing when making choices. One study found that subjects primed with fear spent more time seeking information on the web before a hypothetical voting exercise than those primed with anger.

Pride – Results from the American National Elections Survey found that pride, along with hope and fear, explained a significant amount of the variance in peoples' 2008 voting choices. The size of the effect of expressions of pride on voting for McCain was roughly one third of the size of the effect of party identification, typically the strongest predictor. Appeals to pride were also found to be effective in motivating voter turnout among high-propensity voters, though the effect was not as strong as appeals to shame.

Neuroticism- This is usually defined as emotional
instability characterized by more extreme and maladaptive
responses to stressors and a higher likelihood of negative emotions (e.g., anxiety, anger, and fear). This has become a big influencer in recent elections and referendums, like the 2016 EU referendum and 2016 Presidential Election, have been run from a populist standpoint, where they have played upon voters fears. This conception of neuroticism as a lowered threshold for detecting and responding to stimuli as threatening or dangerous suggests that individuals high on this trait will be more receptive to campaigns, such as populism, which specifically prey on fears of looming threats and dangers. Research shows that once these fears have been activated, they can affect decisions of all kinds, including voting behaviour.

Effects of voting on emotion 
The act of voting itself can produce emotional responses that may bias the choices voters make and potentially affect subsequent emotional states.

A recent study on voters in Israel found that voters' cortisol levels, the so-called "stress hormone," were significantly higher immediately before entering a polling place than personal baseline levels measured on a similar, non-election day. This may be significant for voting choices since cortisol is known to affect memory consolidation, memory retrieval, and reward- and risk-seeking behavior. Acute stress may disrupt decision making and affect cognition.

Additionally, research done on voters in Ann Arbor and Durham after the US 2008 elections showed partial evidence that voting for the losing candidate may lead to increased cortisol levels relative to levels among voters who chose the winning candidate.

Moreover, Rui Antunes indicated within a 2010 academic study that a personal relationship created with the political parties in America. This may be due to the strong influence in the USA of the development of this relationship through a socialisation process which is somewhat caused by the nature of the individual's background.

Practical implications

Political campaigns 
The use of emotional appeals in political campaigns to increase support for a candidate or decrease support for a challenger is a widely recognized practice and a common element of any campaign strategy. Campaigns often seek to instill positive emotions such as enthusiasm and hopefulness about their candidate among party bases to improve turnout and political activism while seeking to raise fear and anxiety about the challenger. Enthusiasm tends to reinforce preferences, whereas fear and anxiety tends to interrupt behavioral patterns and leads individuals to look for new sources of information.

Political surveys 
Research findings illustrate that it is possible to influence a persons' attitudes toward a political candidate using carefully crafted survey questions, which in turn may influence his or her voting behavior. A laboratory study in the UK focused on participants' attitude toward former Prime Minister Tony Blair during the 2001 pre-election period via a telephone survey. After gauging participants' interest in politics, the survey asked the participants to list either i) two positive characteristics of the Prime Minister, ii) five positive characteristics of the Prime Minister, iii) two negative characteristics of the Prime Minister, or iv) five negative characteristics of the Prime Minister. Participants were then asked to rate their attitude toward Blair on a scale from 1 to 7 where higher values reflected higher favorability.

Listing five positive or negative characteristics for the Prime Minister was challenging; especially for those with little or no interest in politics. The ones asked to list five positive characteristics were primed negatively towards the politicians because it was too hard to name five good traits. On the contrary, following the same logic, those who were to list five negative, came to like the politician better than before. This conclusion was reflected in the final survey stage when participants evaluated their attitude toward the Prime Minister.

Military voting behavior 

Recent research into whether military personnel vote or behave politically than the general population has challenged some long-held conventional wisdom. The political behavior of officers has been extensively studied by Holsti, Van Riper & Unwalla, and Feaver & Kohn In the United States, particularly since the end of the Vietnam War, officers are strongly conservative in nature and tend to identify with the Republican Party in the United States.

Enlisted personnel political behavior has only been studied more recently, notably by Dempsey, and Inbody. Enlisted personnel, often thought to behave and vote as did officers, do not. They more nearly represent the general population. In general, the usual demographic predictors of voting and other political behavior apply to military personnel.

Technological implications

Access to technology 
We are currently living in an era within which we are becoming increasingly reliant upon the use of technology; many of us have become accustomed to using technology and therefore would find it very difficult to function and make decisions without it. As a result of this, voting behaviour has been changing significantly in recent years due to these advancements in technology and media, "tracing the rise of email, party websites, social media, online videos and gamification, scholars have shown, since the 1990s, parties have become heavily dependent on digital technology." This portrays just how important access to technology is, as many will alter their views on which political party to vote for, whether to vote at all and whether they encourage the next generation to vote based upon what they learn whilst using technology. Figures show that even in a country like India, ravaged with poverty, the high importance of technology in comparison to the importance of hygiene as: "far more people in India have access to a cell phone than to a toilet and improved sanitation." Evidently, access to technology is not only important, it will soon become essential to allow a voter to gain a full understanding of their voters rights as well as helping them to make the important decision of whom to vote for since "casting a vote is the main way in which people participate in the democratic process."

Impacts of social media 
Research has shown that due to the advancements in technology over the last two decades, politicians and their political parties are becoming heavily reliant on technology and in particular social media outlets such as Facebook, Instagram, Twitter and Snapchat. Martin Moore supported this view in his book, "A survey conducted amongst British journalists that summer found that seventy per cent were using Twitter for reporting." Therefore voters are now accessing information from less conventional outlets; yet the ease allows for politicians to expand their reach from the eldest generations, right down to the younger generations. Although social media has many positive implications, the lack of monitoring and accessibility opens a gateway for foreign interference in elections and indoctrination of voters.

Statistics
In the 2016 US Presidential Election, 61.4 percent of the citizen voting-age population reported voting, a number not statistically different from the 61.8 percent who reported voting in 2012. In 2016, turnout increased to 65.3 percent for non-Hispanic whites, but decreased to 59.6 percent for non-Hispanic blacks. 2016 was only the second election ever where the share of non-Hispanic black voters decreased, from 12.9 percent in 2012 to 11.9 percent in 2016. When analyzed together, reported turnout by age, race and Hispanic origin differed in 2016 as well. In comparison to 2012, younger non-Hispanic whites between the ages of 18 to 29 and between the ages of 30 to 44 reported higher turnout in 2016, while voting rates for the two oldest groups of non-Hispanic whites were not statistically different. Meanwhile, for non-Hispanic blacks, turnout rates decreased in 2016 for every age group. For other race non-Hispanics and Hispanics of any race, voting rates between 2012 and 2016 were not statistically different for any age groups.

Loss aversion 
The loss aversion theory by Amos Tversky and Daniel Kahneman is often associated with voting behavior as people are more likely to use their vote to avoid the effect of an unfavorable policy rather than supporting a favorable policy. From a psychological perspective, value references are crucial to determine individual preferences. Furthermore, it could be argued that the
fact that loss aversion is found only in high stakes serves as a validation of loss aversion, because it shows that even when people care much about the outcome of their decision they are still biased. This is evident when it comes to elections and referendums, as voters make their choices based on the cost benefit analysis. For instance, it has been suggested that the loss aversion theory can be used to explain why negativity bias played a crucial role in the 2014 campaign for the Scottish independence referendum.

See also 

 Altruism theory of voting
 Emotion
 Emotional bias
 Emotions in decision making
 Role of networks in electoral behavior
 Voting correctly
 Voting gender gap
Political Cognition

References 

Comparative politics
Behavior